Ivkić is a South Slavic surname. Notable people with the surname include:

 Dominik Ivkič (born 1997), Slovenian football player
 Leonardo Ivkic (born 2003), Austrian football player
 Monika Ivkic (born 1989), Austrian singer

Croatian surnames
Serbian surnames